"No Charge" is a country music song, written by songwriter Harlan Howard.  It was first recorded by country singer Melba Montgomery, whose 1974 version was a #1 country hit in both the US and Canada, as well as making #39 on the US pop charts. In the UK, the song is associated with J.J. Barrie, whose 1976 version was a #1 UK hit.

About the song
Melba Montgomery had already recorded a series of duets hits with country music artists George Jones, Charlie Louvin, and Gene Pitney during the 1960s (the most successful of those being "We Must Have Been Out of Our Minds" with Jones). In the early 1970s, she began focusing on a solo career, but did not have notable success.

Eventually, she began recording for Elektra Records, where her struggles continued. Then, Howard forwarded a song to Montgomery he thought would be perfect for her: "No Charge." She recorded "No Charge" in early 1974, and it was released that February. By the end of May, Montgomery enjoyed her first taste of solo success, reaching No. 1 on the Billboards Hot Country Singles chart.  The song also reached No. 39 on the Billboard Hot 100.

Commenting on the record to Tom Roland in The Billboard Book of Number One Country Hits, Harlan Howard said, "I've never written a song that moves people so much. I've had guys tell me they almost wrecked their truck when they heard it 'cause it made them cry. I had a lot of delightful records in many different languages on that song, but I guess that's probably my favorite song as far as impact is concerned."

When playing the JJ Barrie version on Capital Radio's Top 40 programme, London DJ Roger Scott introduced the song as a "comedy record", and feigned uncontrollable laughter at the end, picking up on the lines "For advice and the knowledge / and the cost of your college".

Synopsis
A young boy hands his mother an itemized list of charges he says he's owed for performing various chores and comes to collect; the singer performs this in spoken word. The mother responds (singing) by reminding her son about all the things she's done for him, that she never asked him to pay for services rendered and that, all things considered, "the cost of real love is no charge."

Enlightened, the young boy realizes that his mother is right and changes the amount due to "paid in full" (once again, narrated) before the singer sings the moral. "No Charge" was one of the few songs that talked about motherhood during this time, which might be one of the reasons why it was so popular.

Chart performance

Weekly charts
Melba Montgomery

Shirley Caesar

J.J. Barrie

Year-end charts

Cover versions
The song has been recorded by numerous other artists since its release by Montgomery. The most successful version was recorded by J.J. Barrie, who took the Bill Amesbury produced song to No. 1 on the UK Singles Chart in June 1976, where it remained for one week.

In Canada the song is often associated with Tommy Hunter who performed the song on the CBC Television show.

Fellow country singers Johnny Cash and Tammy Wynette recorded versions of the song in the 1970s. It has also been a popular Christian song through the years, most famously performed by Shirley Caesar, who added to the moral by recalling Jesus' sacrifice for humanity.

Billy Connolly recorded a parody of the song in 1976 called "No Chance (No Charge)", which had a reference to domestic violence. It reached Number 24 on the UK Singles Chart.

C. C. (Chris) Sandford recorded a comedy version in 1976 entitled: No Charge (Chuck) (UK: Power Exchange Records PX 223)

References

Melba Montgomery songs
1974 singles
1976 singles
UK Singles Chart number-one singles
Songs written by Harlan Howard
1974 songs
Elektra Records singles